"Here It Comes Again" is a song written by Barry Mason and Les Reed in 1965. It was recorded by The Fortunes and released on 10 September 1965. It reached number four on the UK Singles Chart and repeated the feat in Canada. In the US, it reached number 27 on the Billboard Hot 100 chart that same year.

In popular culture
A version of it was used as a jingle for BBC DJ Tony Brandon in the early 1970s.

References

External links
The Fortunes discography

1965 singles
The Fortunes songs
Songs written by Les Reed (songwriter)
Songs written by Barry Mason
1965 songs
Decca Records singles